Hospital Universitari General de Catalunya (English: General Teaching Hospital of Catalonia), is a private hospital in Sant Cugat del Vallès, Barcelona, Catalonia.

Whilst the hospital officially does not specify in any medical field, it is one of the highest rated in Catalonia for general surgery. The hospital is equipped with five operating theatres and over 20 general surgeons. Furthermore, a large part of the hospital's area is dedicated to inpatient suites where patients are kept before and after surgery and additionally in cases of needing prolonged medical attention or observation.

Specialties

References

Hospitals in Catalonia
Buildings and structures in the Province of Barcelona
Sant Cugat del Vallès
Hospitals established in 1984